The Football NSW 2009 season was the top flight football competition format in New South Wales. The competition consisted of four divisions across the State of New South Wales.

League Tables

2009 NSW Premier League

The 2009 NSW Premier League season was played over 22 rounds, beginning on 1 March 2009, with the regular season concluding on the 9th of August.

Finals

2009 NSW Super League

The 2009 NSW Super League season was played over 22 rounds, beginning on 24 March with the regular season concluding on 16 August 2009.

Finals

2009 NSW State League Division 1

The 2009 NSW State League Division 1 season was played over 22 rounds, beginning on 14 March with the regular season concluding on 16 August 2010.

Finals

2009 NSW State League Division 2

The 2009 NSW State League Division 2 season was played over 22 rounds, beginning on 28 March with the regular season concluding on 30 August 2009. There were 16 teams divided into two conferences, North and South. There were 14 rounds of conference games followed by 8 rounds of combined conference games. The top five teams on a combined ladder competed in the finals series.

Finals

References

2009 in Australian soccer